The 1932 United States presidential election in New York took place on November 8, 1932. All contemporary 48 states were part of the 1932 United States presidential election. Voters chose 47 electors to the Electoral College, which selected the president and vice president. 

New York was won by Democratic Governor of New York Franklin D. Roosevelt, who was challenging embattled incumbent Republican President Herbert Hoover. Roosevelt ran with Speaker of the House John Nance Garner of Texas, and Hoover ran with incumbent Vice President Charles Curtis of Kansas.

With the incumbent Republican president greatly weakened by his failures to adequately address the Great Depression, the New York Governor easily carried his home state in the midst of a nationwide Democratic landslide. Franklin Roosevelt took 54.07% of the vote in New York State versus Herbert Hoover's 41.33%, a margin of 12.73%. Socialist candidate Norman Thomas finished a distant third, with 3.78%. Although, despite being Roosevelt's home state – and although he won the state comfortably – in the context of the 1932 nationwide Democratic landslide, New York weighed in for this election as 5% more Republican than the national average. 

The presidential election of 1932 was a partisan election, with more than 95.4% of the electorate casting votes for either the Democratic Party or the Republican. 

1932 was the first time a Democrat had won New York's electoral votes since 1912, when Republican vote-splitting for the third party candidacy of Theodore Roosevelt had allowed Democrat Woodrow Wilson to win the state with a plurality of only 41% of the vote. Franklin Roosevelt's 54.07% made him the first Democratic presidential candidate to win an absolute majority of the vote in New York State since Samuel Tilden in 1876. Roosevelt's 12.73% victory margin over Hoover was the widest victory margin ever for a Democratic presidential candidate in New York State up to that point, although it would be surpassed just 4 years later by Roosevelt's own 20-point re-election victory in 1936.

Roosevelt's support in the state did not appear spontaneously in 1932; his winning strategy in New York State was primarily to build upon the Democratic coalition fellow New Yorker Al Smith had organized behind him in the 1928 election. Smith had narrowly lost the state in the midst of a nationwide Republican landslide, but had dramatically improved upon how Democrats before him had done, and laid the groundwork for turning the state Democratic in 1932 and beyond. In 1920 and 1924, Republicans had swept every county in New York State and Democrats took less than 30% of the vote. In 1928, Smith came within 2 points of winning the state by sweeping all five boroughs of heavily populated New York City, winning the state capital of Albany in Albany County along with neighboring Rensselaer County, and winning two counties in northern New York along the Saint Lawrence River, Clinton County and Franklin County. FDR turned a 2-point statewide Democratic defeat in 1928 into a 13-point victory in 1932 primarily by pushing up turnout and victory margins in Smith's 1928 counties, as the county map remained almost entirely the same. Only one county in New York State actually changed hands from Hoover in 1928 to Roosevelt in 1932, rural Sullivan County, which voted Democratic for the first time since 1912.

The most vital component to Roosevelt's victory in New York State was his overwhelming landslide in the massively populated 5 boroughs of New York City. Roosevelt took over 70% of the vote in the Bronx, and over 60% in Manhattan, Brooklyn, Queens, and Staten Island. Up to this point, 1932 was the strongest victory ever for a Democrat in the city, although Roosevelt would outperform himself with an even stronger performance in the city in 1936. FDR built on the urban, ethnic coalition that had delivered the city to Al Smith 4 years earlier, and with the rise of the New Deal Coalition, New York would be solidified as one of the most Democratic cities in the United States. Just as Al Smith's 1928 counties remained loyal to the Democrats in 1932, most of upstate New York which had gone Republican in 1928 remained loyal to Herbert Hoover in 1932, albeit with reduced margins. Albany County, home to the state capital of Albany, provided Roosevelt's strongest victory outside of New York City, giving him over 60% of the vote. 

Hoover only received at least forty percent of the vote in seven of the state assembly districts within New York City and only won a majority of the vote in one, the 15th district. His vote total in New York City declined from 36.71% in 1928, to 26.62% in 1932. Roosevelt received 387,000 votes from Jews in New York City while Hoover received 95,000-105,000 votes and Thomas received 50,000-60,000 votes, which accounted for half of Thomas' 122,565 votes from New York City.

Results

Results by county

See also
 United States presidential elections in New York
 Presidency of Franklin D. Roosevelt
 Timeline of the Great Depression

References

New York
1932
1932 New York (state) elections